753 Naval Air Squadron (753 NAS) was a Naval Air Squadron of the Royal Navy's Fleet Air Arm. It was active as an Observer Training Squadron from 1939 to 1946 as part of No.2 Observer School. Formed at RNAS Lee-on-Solent, the squadron moved to RNAS Arbroath just over one year later and then spending four years there before relocating again, this time to RNAS Rattray, where it eventually disbanded.

History of 753 NAS

Observer Training Squadron (1939 - 1946) 

753 Naval Air Squadron formed at RNAS Lee-on-Solent (HMS Daedalus), situated near Lee-on-the-Solent in Hampshire, approximately four miles west of Portsmouth, on 24 May 1939 as an Observer Training Squadron and being part of No.2 Observer School. It was initially equipped with Blackburn Shark Mk II and Fairey Seal aircraft. In the following December the squadron then acquired Fairey Swordfish I.

753 NAS moved to RNAS Arbroath (HMS Condor), located near Arbroath in East Angus, Scotland, on the 19 August 1940. Discarding the Seal, but keeping the Shark Mk II and Swordfish I during the move, the squadron then also operated Fairey Albacore Mk I from August 1941, which was soon followed by de Havilland Tiger Moth in the December. In November 1943 Stinson Reliant I was received and was used by the squadron for almost one year, up until September 1944. Lastly, from December 1944, the squadron operated Fairey Barracuda Mk II up until disbandment.

On the 1 November 1945, 753 NAS left Arbroath and moved to RNAS Rattray (HMS Merganser), near Crimond, Aberdeenshire. The squadron remained at the base, operating Fairey Barracuda, until disbanding on the 9 August 1946.

Aircraft flown

753 Naval Air Squadron has flown a number of different aircraft types, including:
Blackburn Shark Mk II (May 1939 - Jan 1942)
Fairey Seal (1939)
Fairey Swordfish I (Dec 1939 - Jun 1945)
Fairey Albacore Mk I (Aug 1941 - Dec 1944)
de Havilland Tiger Moth (Dec 1941)
Stinson Reliant I (Nov 1943 - Sep 1944)
Fairey Barracuda Mk II (Dec 1944 - Aug 1946)

Naval Air Stations  

753 Naval Air Squadron operated from a number of naval air stations of the Royal Navy, in Scotland and England:
Royal Naval Air Station LEE-ON-SOLENT (24 May 1939 - 19 August 1940)
Royal Naval Air Station ARBROATH (19 August 1940 - 1 November 1945)
Royal Naval Air Station RATTRAY (1 November 1945 - 9 August 1946)

Commanding Officers 

List of commanding officers of 753 Naval Air Squadron with month and year of appointment and end:
Lt-Cdr G. N. P. Stringer, DFC, RN (May 1939-Oct 1940)
Capt A. C. Newson, RM (Oct 1940-May 1941)
Lt-Cdr L.A. Cubitt, RN (May 1941-Sep 1941)
Lt-Cdr A. C. Mills, RNVR (Sep 1941-Jul 1942)
Lt-Cdr F. R. Steggall, RNVR (Jul 1942-Mar 1944)
Lt-Cdr R. E. Stewart, RNVR (Mar 1944-Aug 1945)
Lt-Cdr A. J. Phillips, RN (Aug 1945-Aug 1946)

References

Citations

Bibliography

700 series Fleet Air Arm squadrons
Military units and formations established in 1939
Military units and formations of the Royal Navy in World War II